Santa Ana District is one of ten districts of the province La Convención in Peru.

References